Edmonton Street News, also known by its abbreviated letters ESN is a street newspaper in Edmonton, Alberta, Canada. It was established in 2002 and is distributed on the streets of Edmonton and, since August 2010 when Calgary Street Talk was discontinued, in Calgary, to the homeless, handicapped and underemployed in exchange for a donation.

Vendors purchase papers at 50 cents a copy.

In 2012, the name changed to Alberta Street News.

See also
International Network of Street Papers
North American Street Newspaper Association

References

External links
 Edmonton Street News
 Alberta Street News – Alberta's only street newspaper

Newspapers published in Edmonton
Street newspapers
Newspapers established in 2002
2002 establishments in Alberta